The Sand Hill River is a  tributary of the Red River of the North in northwestern Minnesota in the United States.

Sand Hill River was named for the sand dunes near the end of its course.

Course 
The Sand Hill River flows generally west from its source, Sand Hill Lake, near the town of Fosston in Polk County, dipping south through Mahnomen County and Norman County before returning to Polk County and passing the towns of Rindal, Fertile, and Climax.

See also
List of Minnesota rivers
List of tributaries of Hudson Bay

References

Sources 

Rivers of Polk County, Minnesota
Rivers of Mahnomen County, Minnesota
Rivers of Norman County, Minnesota
Rivers of Minnesota
Tributaries of Hudson Bay